Cyrtotrachelus dux, the Bamboo beetle or Long Armed Snout Beetle, is a species of beetles belonging to the family Curculionidae.

Description 
The basic color of the body ranges from light brown to dark reddish brown. In the males the first pair of legs is very long. Larvae suck sap from tender bamboo shoots from May to October. These large beetles are considered a serious pest in bamboo plantation, frequently leading to the death the host plants. Nematodes are commonly used to control this pest. These weevils are edible and are usually consumed in fried form by various ethnic groups.

Distribution and habitat  
This species is widespread in Asia, mainly in Bangladesh, China, Thailand, Myanmar, India, Sri Lanka and Nepal. These giant weevils live in forests and plantations of bamboo. In Nepal, young kids like to fly this beetle by tying thread on its leg.

References 

 Biolib
 Meinan
 Virtual Zoo

Dryophthorinae
Beetles of Asia
Beetles described in 1845